is a former Japanese swimmer who competed in the 1984 Summer Olympics and in the 1988 Summer Olympics.

References

1961 births
Living people
Japanese male breaststroke swimmers
Olympic swimmers of Japan
Swimmers at the 1984 Summer Olympics
Swimmers at the 1988 Summer Olympics
Asian Games medalists in swimming
Swimmers at the 1978 Asian Games
Swimmers at the 1982 Asian Games
Asian Games gold medalists for Japan
Asian Games silver medalists for Japan
Asian Games bronze medalists for Japan
Medalists at the 1978 Asian Games
Medalists at the 1982 Asian Games
Universiade medalists in swimming
Universiade gold medalists for Japan
Universiade silver medalists for Japan
Medalists at the 1983 Summer Universiade
20th-century Japanese people